John W. Russell (May 19, 1936 - February 25, 2004)  was an American trainer of Thoroughbred racehorses, a freelance sportswriter and the author of the 2002 novel In the Shadow of Dark Horses. Among his clients, he trained for the nationally prominent stables of Ogden Phipps, Fred W. Hooper and Bud Willmot's Kinghaven Farms. He is best known for training Precisionist, Track Robbery and three-time Champion and U.S. Racing Hall of Fame inductee, Susan's Girl.

References

1936 births
2004 deaths
Deaths from cancer in California
American horse trainers
20th-century American novelists
People from Lincolnshire
People from San Diego County, California
20th-century American non-fiction writers
Sportswriters from California